The Roman Catholic Archdiocese of Pala is a diocese in Pala in the Ecclesiastical province of N'Djamena in Chad.

History
 December 19, 1956: Established as Apostolic Prefecture of Pala from the Diocese of Garoua in Cameroon
 1964: Promoted as Diocese of Pala

Leadership, in reverse chronological order
 Bishops of Pala (Roman rite), below
 Bishop Dominique Tinoudji (July 3, 2021 – ...)
 Bishop Jean-Claude Bouchard, O.M.I. (February 26, 1977  – September 25, 2020)
 Bishop Georges-Hilaire Dupont, O.M.I. (January 16, 1964  – June 28, 1975)
 Prefect Apostolic of Pala (Roman rite), below
 Fr. Honoré Jouneaux, O.M.I. (1957–1964)

See also
Roman Catholicism in Chad

Sources
 GCatholic.org

Pala
Christian organizations established in 1956
Roman Catholic dioceses and prelatures established in the 20th century
Roman Catholic Ecclesiastical Province of N'Djaména